The Battle of Changsha (1939) (September 17, 1939 – October 6, 1939) was an unsuccessful attempt by Japan to take the city of Changsha, China, during the second Sino-Japanese War.

The Japanese forces comprised 100,000 troops in 6 Divisions, in addition to many river-going vessels. The Chinese defenders numbered 160,000 troops in 5 Army Groups, 1 Army, and 7 Corps.

Japan 
Japan (Early September 1939)

11th Army -  Yasuji Okamura
 6th Division - Lt. Gen.  Shiro Inaba
 11th Infantry Brigade
 13th Infantry Regiment
 47th Infantry Regiment
 36th Infantry Brigade
 45th Infantry Regiment
 23rd Infantry Regiment
 6th Field Artillery Regiment
 6th Cavalry Regiment
 6th Engineer Regiment
 6th Transport Regiment
 106th Division - Lt. Gen. Ryotaro Nakai
 111th Infantry Brigade
 113th Infantry Regiment
 147th Infantry Regiment
 136th Infantry Brigade
 125th Infantry Regiment
 145th Infantry Regiment
 106th Field Artillery Regiment
 106th Cavalry Regiment
 106th Engineer Regiment
 106th Transport Regiment
 33rd Division -  Lt. Gen. Shigetaro Amakasu
 33rd infantry Brigade Group:
 213th Infantry Regiment
 214th Infantry Regiment
 215th Infantry Regiment
 33rd Recon Regiment
 33rd Mountain Artillery Regiment
 33rd Military Engineer Regiment
 33rd Transport Regiment
 13th Division - Gen. Shizuichi Tanaka
 Nara Detachment of 13th Division - Major Gen. Akira Nara
 26th Infantry Brigade - Major Gen. Akira Nara
 58th Infantry Regiment
 116th Infantry Regiment
 With elements of:
 19th Mountain Artillery Regiment
  17th Cavalry Regiment
 13th Engineer Regiment
 13th Transport Regiment
 3rd Division - Lt. Gen. Shinichi Fujita
 Uemura Detachment of 3rd Division  - Major Gen. Mikio Uemura
 29th Infantry Brigade - Major Gen. Mikio Uemura
 18th Infantry Regiment
 34th Infantry Regiment
 With elements of:
 3rd Field Artillery Regiment
 3rd Cavalry Regiment
 3rd Engineer Regiment
 3rd Transport Regiment
 101st Division - Yaheta Saito, s/b Lt. Gen. Masatoshi Saito
 101st Infantry Brigade
 101st Infantry Regiment
 149th Infantry Regiment
 102nd Infantry Brigade
 103rd Infantry Regiment
 157th Infantry Regiment
 101st Field Artillery Regiment
 101st Cavalry Regiment
 101st Engineer Regiment
 101st Transport Regiment

Naval Forces:

China Area Fleet
 11th Sentai
 13th Gunboat Unit
 Shanghai SNLF (a detachment)
 4th Guard Unit

Notes:
 Naval forces were involved an opposed landing at the mouth of the Mi-lo River on the Hsiang River "enemy marines, elements of 3rd Division (Uemura Column /29th Bde), scores of ships and more than a 100 motor boats." Troops are identified on map 17 as the Muragami Column.

China 
(Early September 1939)

9th War Area - Chen Cheng 
 19th Army Group  - Lo Cho-ying
32nd Corps - Sun Ken-tang
 139th Division - Li Chao-ying
 141st Division - Tang Yung-hang
 49th Corps - Liu Tuo-chuan
 105th Division - Wang Tieh-han
 9th Reserve Division - Chang Yen-chuan
 1st Army Group - Lu Han
 58th Corps - Sun Tu
 New 10th Division - Liu Cheng-fu
 New 11th Division -  Lu Tao-yuan
 60th Corps - An En-pu
 183rd Division - Li Chao-ying
 184th Division - Wan Pao-pang
 2nd Advance Column  - ?
 6th Kiangsi  Preservation Regiment
 30th Army Group - Wang Ling-chi
 78th Corps - Hsia Shou-hsun
 New 13th Division - Liu Juo-pi
 New 16th Division -  Wu Shao-chuan
 72nd Corps - Han Chuan-pu
 New 14th Division - Chen Liang-chi
 New 15th Division -  Fu-yi
 Hupei Hunan Border Area Advance Force - Fan Sung-pu
 8th Corps - Li Yu-tang
 3rd Division - Chao His-tien
 197th Division - Ting Ping-chun
 3rd Advance Column  - Chung Shih-pan
 4th Kiangsi Preservation Regiment - Cheng Chih-ching
 5th Kiangsi Preservation Regiment - Chung Shih-pan
 9th Kiangsi Preservation Regiment - Hsu Pu-chih
 1st Advance Column  - Kung Ho-chung
 Hupei Peace Preservation Regiment - Pi Tsung-yung
 27th Army Group - Yang Sen
 20th Corps - Yang Han-yu
 133rd Division - Li Chao-ying
 134th Division - Yang Kan-tsai
 15th Army - Kuan Lin-cheng [acting]
 52nd Corps - Chang Yao-ming
 2nd Division - Chao Kung-wa
 25th Division - Chang Han-chu
 195th Division - Chin Yi-chih
 37th Corps  - Chen Pei
 60th Division - Liang Chung-chiang
 95th Division - Lo Chi
 79th Corps - Hsia Chu-chung
 98th Division - Wang Chia-pen
 82nd Division - Lo Chi-chiang
 140th Division - Li Tang
 20th Army Group  - Shang Chen, Dep:Huo Kuei-chang
 Tung-ting Garrison  - Huo Kuei-chang
 53rd Corps - Chou Fu-cheng
 116th Division - Chao Sao-tsung *
 130th Division -  Chu Hung-hsun *
 54th Corps - Chen Lieh
 14th Division - Chueh Han-chien
 50th Division -  Chang Chun *
 23rd Division - Sheng Feng-yao
 87th Corps - Chou Hsiang-chu
 43rd Division - Chin Teh-yang
 198th Division -  Wang Yu-ying
 73rd Corps - Peng Wei-jen
 15th Division - Wang Chih-pin
 77th Division -  Liu Chi-ming
 4th Corps - Ou Chen
 59th Division - Chang The-neng
 90th Division -  Chen Yung-chi
 102nd Division - Po Hui-chang
 70th Corps - Li Chueh
 90th Division - Tang Po-yin
 107th Division - Tuan Heng *
 New 6th Corps - Chen Chiu-cheng
 5th Division - Tai Chi-tao *
 6th Division - Lung Yun-fei *
 74th Corps - Wang Yao-wu
 51st Division - Li Tien-hsia
 57th Division - Shih Chung-cheng
 58th Division - Chen Shih
 5th Corps - Tu Yu-ming
 1st Honor Division - Cheng Tung-kao
 200th Division - Tai An-lan *
 New 12th Division- Chiu Ching-chuan
 99 Corps -  Fu Chang-fang
 92nd Division - Liang Han-ming *
 76th Division - Wang Ling-yun *
 11th Division - Yey Pei-kao

Notes:
 *  Uncommitted to battle in the campaign.

See also
 National Revolutionary Army
 Imperial Japanese Army

Sources 

Battles of the Second Sino-Japanese War
Second Sino-Japanese War orders of battle